Velvet Hammer  is a studio album by the American band Scrawl, released in 1993 by Simple Machines.

Critical reception

The New York Times wrote: "The music is sparse but strong; Marcy Mays's guitar and Sue Harshe's bass sometimes stand apart, sometimes mesh for buzzing riffs."

Track listing

References

1993 albums
Albums produced by Steve Albini
Scrawl albums